Presidential elections were held in Russia on 2 March 2008, and resulted in the election of Dmitry Medvedev as the third President of Russia. Medvedev was elected for a four-year term, whose candidacy was supported by incumbent president Vladimir Putin and five political parties (United Russia, Fair Russia, Agrarian Party, Civilian Power, and Russian Ecological Party "The Greens"), received 71% of the vote, and defeated Gennady Zyuganov of the Communist Party of the Russian Federation, and Vladimir Zhirinovsky of the Liberal Democratic Party of Russia.

The fairness of the election was disputed, with official monitoring groups giving conflicting reports. Some reported that the election was free and fair, while others reported that not all candidates had equal media coverage and that the opposition to the Kremlin was treated unfairly. Monitoring groups found a number of other irregularities. The European election monitoring group PACE characterized the election as "neither free nor fair."

The Organization for Security and Co-operation in Europe (OSCE) election monitoring group refused to monitor the election because of what it called "severe restrictions on its observers by the Russian government", a charge Russia vehemently rejected, calling the decision "unacceptable".

Candidates

Registered candidates
Candidates are listed in the order they appear on the ballot paper (alphabetical order in Russian).
{| class=wikitable style=text-align:center
! colspan="3"| Candidate name, age,political party
! Political offices
! Details
! Registration date
|-
| style="background:lavender;" |Andrey Bogdanov(38)Democratic Party(campaign)
|
| style="background-color:#DBB726;" |
|Leader of the Democratic Party(2005-2014)Grand Master of the Grand Lodge of Russia(2007–present)
|Registered as a candidate on January 24. Bogdanov had an investigation opened against him for providing too many forged signatures of support for his nomination, but it was reported that even if the accusations were to be proven, his candidacy would not be dismissed. At 38, he was the youngest person to run for president in Russia, a record he would retain until 2018.
|24 January 2008
|-
| style="background:lavender;" |Vladimir Zhirinovsky(61)Liberal Democratic Party(campaign)
|
| style="background-color:;" |
|Deputy of the State Duma(1993–2022)Leader of the Liberal Democratic Party(1991–2022)
|Zhirinovky ran for the presidency on three prior occasions: in 1991, 1996 and 2000. His best result was third with 7.81% support. Registered as a candidate on December 26.
|26 December 2007
|-
| style="background:lavender;" |Gennady Zyuganov(63)Communist Party(campaign)|
| style="background-color:;" |
|Deputy of the State Duma(1993–present)Leader of the Communist Party(1993–present)
|Zyuganov ran for president in 1996 (when he came short just a few percent of the votes) and 2000, but not in 2004. Officially nominated on December 15, 2007, with 215 of 218 votes in favor. Registered as a candidate on December 26.
|26 December 2007
|-
| style="background:lavender;" |Dmitry Medvedev(42)United Russia(campaign)|
| style="background-color:;" |
|First Deputy Prime Minister of Russia(2005-2008)Kremlin Chief of Staff'(2003-2005)
|Medvedev was nominated by the United Russia party, and supported by the parties A Just Russia, Agrarian Party, The Greens and Civilian Power. In addition he was supported by incumbent president Vladimir Putin.
|21 January 2008
|}

Withdrawn candidates

Campaign

Following his appointment as First Deputy Prime Minister, many political observers expected Medvedev to be nominated as Putin's successor for the 2008 presidential elections. There were other potential candidates, such as Sergey Ivanov and Viktor Zubkov, but on December 10, 2007, President Putin announced that Medvedev was his preferred successor. Four parties supporting Putin also declared Medvedev to be their candidate to the post – United Russia, A Just Russia, Agrarian Party of Russia and Civilian Power. United Russia held its party congress on December 17, 2007, where by secret ballot of the delegates, Medvedev was officially endorsed as their candidate in the 2008 presidential election. He formally registered his candidacy with the Central Election Commission on December 20, 2007, and said he would step down as chairman of Gazprom, since under the current laws, the president was not permitted to hold another post. Sources close to Gazprom and Medvedev told the Vedomosti newspaper that Medvedev might be replaced by Putin at Gazprom. His registration was formally accepted as valid by the Russian Central Election Commission on January 21, 2008.

 
In January 2008, Medvedev launched his presidential campaign with stops in the regions.
In his first speech since he was endorsed, Medvedev announced that, as president, he would appoint Vladimir Putin to the post of prime minister to head the Russian government. Although constitutionally barred from a third consecutive presidential term, such a role would allow Putin to continue as an influential figure in Russian politics Putin pledged that he would accept the position of prime minister should Medvedev be elected president. Election posters portrayed the pair side by side with the slogan "Together we will win" ("").

During the pre-election debates on the Star TV on February 20, Nikolai Gotsa, a representative of Bogdanov, accused Vladimir Zhirinovsky and his party of lying to and betraying their supporters. He accused them of voting in favor of government initiatives they criticize when in public. Zhirinovsky replied fiercely, insulting Gotsa and calling him a "sick man, a schizoid", "bastard", and punched him when they went off the cameras. Bogdanov and Gotsa launched a legal issue against Zhirinovsky. On February 28, in another debate, Bogdanov claimed he had a personal talk with Zhirinovsky, and that the latter had threatened his life and demanded to withdraw the issue.

Opinion polls

According to opinion polls taken prior to the election, up to 82% of people said that they would vote for Dmitry Medvedev, the candidate endorsed by Vladimir Putin as his preferred successor. The second most popular candidate was Gennady Zuganov, Leader of the Communist Party of Russia, who was expected to receive between 6% and 15% of the vote.
An opinion poll by the Yury Levada Analytical Center, taken in September after Vladimir Putin announced he would head the electoral list of United Russia in the 2007 Parliamentary elections, showed a commanding lead for Sergei Ivanov and Dmitry Medvedev, with 34% and 30% of the vote respectively. Viktor Zubkov and Sergei Glazyev received only 4% of the vote each.

Conduct

The Organization for Security and Cooperation in Europe, in its capacity as an international election standards watchdog, refused to monitor the election because of what it called severe restrictions on its observers by the Russian government. After weeks of negotiations, Russia agreed to increase the observer numbers for the ODIHR mission and extend the time frame for its visit, but the ODIHR claimed that the offer still didn't meet their requirements, insisting that it needed to send at least 50 of its observers to Russia on February 15, five days before the date proposed by Moscow, in order to effectively monitor the election campaign.

Russia responded by insisting that it was complying fully with its international obligations and that its invitation for 400 monitors meets international standards. It accused the OSCE of attempting to politicize the dispute and that it suspected ODIHR's intention from the outset was to boycott the election, saying that the ODIHR had displayed "contempt for basic ethical norms ... which, it seems, indicates that ODIHR from the start was not even trying to agree on mutually acceptable conditions for monitoring."

Russian Foreign Minister Sergey Lavrov stated that 

Russia's Foreign Ministry spokesman, Mikhail Kamynin, said "The ODIHR flatly rejected a compromise without providing any clear explanations for its position. We believe such actions are unacceptable." Kamynin added that Moscow "deeply regretted" the OSCE refusal, accusing the organization, which he said generally sends 10-20 experts to observe election campaigns one or two weeks ahead of polls, of political bias against Russia.

An incident arose during the election when three out of nine members of the Biysk Electoral Commission refused to sign the protocols citing widespread falsifications in their Priobsky Division. The rest of commission decided to approve the protocols as the alleged abuse was not reported during the election.

The European election monitoring group PACE characterized the election as "neither free nor fair."

Representatives from the GOLOS monitoring group stated that "the Election Day was held in a relatively quiet atmosphere in contrast to the State Duma election day. Such large-scale violations observed then as campaigning next to polling stations, transporting of voters, intimidation of voters and others were practically non-existent." They did however report irregularities in the election.

The Commonwealth of Independent States observer mission said the election was free, fair and in line with international standards. "The CIS observer mission states that the election is a major factor in the further democratization of public life in the Russian Federation, and recognizes it as free, open and transparent," said Nauryz Aidarov, head of the CIS mission.

Observers from the Shanghai Cooperation Organisation said the election was free, fair and in line with international standards.

An observing group from Parliamentary Assembly of the Council of Europe stated that the result of the election was a "reflection of the will of an electorate whose democratic potential was, unfortunately, not tapped". They said "In the elections, which had more the character of a plebiscite on the last eight years in this country, the people of Russia voted for the stability and continuity associated with the incumbent President and the candidate promoted by him. The President-elect will have a solid mandate given to him by the majority of Russians."Russian Presidential election: for an election to be good it takes a good process, not just a good election day , PACE, Strasbourg, March 3, 2008

The head of Russia's electoral commission Vladimir Churov said that media coverage for the presidential election had been "fair but not equal".The Economist reported that Medvedev has been mentioned over six times more often than his three rivals in 1,000 different news sources, according to figures from SCAN, a media database owned by Interfax, but stated that this could be due to Medvedev's high-profile job as chairman of the state-owned gas monopoly, Gazprom.

A report by the International Herald Tribune described Medvedev's election as "the culmination of Putin's efforts to consolidate control over the government, business and the news media since taking office eight years ago."

Russian Novaya Gazeta'' claimed that there were forged election protocols and cases when independent observers were not allowed to monitor the election process. Journalist Victor Shenderovich claims that only 3.5% of voters came to the elections in certain North Caucasus regions according to independent observers, whereas the Central Election committee reports more than 90% turnaround.

Results
Medvedev was also endorsed by Agrarian Party, Fair Russia, Russian Ecological Party - "The Greens" and Civilian Power, but was officially nominated as a United Russia candidate.

Results by federal subject

Reactions
According to Russia Today, many in the Western media portrayed Russia's presidential election as nothing but a farce. It reported that the claims of rigging the election were not supported by the various international election monitoring organizations in attendance.

Political analyst and United Russia member, Sergei Markov, said that the outcome of this poll was predetermined because of how much support the Russian people show for Vladimir Putin's policies. "The Russian people have seen how successful these policies have been, and they want them to continue", he says. Markov cited fears that the West would interfere and change the course of the election, like they did in Ukraine and Georgia.

See also
Bald–hairy

References

External links
TrendLines Research International Election Projections Monthly Tracking chart of polling sentiment for the 3 leading contenders in next Russian presidential election.
 Official results 
BBC NEWS Viewpoints: Russian presidential election Six Russians give their views on the election and predict the outcome. 
;  - YouTube videos of electoral officials in Moscow trying to prevent the observers from registering an election fraud (they claim the box was stuffed with pro-Medvedev ballots prior to the poll opening); electoral officials attempting to expel observers with simulated terrorist threat and air-strike sirens.

 
Presidential elections in Russia
Dmitry Medvedev
Russia
Russia